The System Management Controller (SMC) is a subsystem of Intel and Apple processor-based Macintosh computers. It is similar in function to the older SMU or PMU of non-Intel Macintosh computers.

Overview
The SMC has roles in controlling thermal and power management, battery charging, video mode switching, sleep and wake, hibernation, and LED indicators. It also enables enforcement of the macOS End User License, allowing macOS to identify when it is running on non-Apple hardware.

See also
 Embedded controller (EC)
 Power management integrated circuit (PMIC)
 Power Management Unit (PMU)
 System Management Unit (SMU)
 Apple T2

References

External links
EFI and SMC firmware updates for Intel-based Macs

Products introduced in 2006
Macintosh computers
Apple Inc. hardware